In standard Danish and Swedish, nouns have two grammatical genders, and pronouns have the same two grammatical genders in addition to two natural genders similar to English.

Overview

Historically, nouns in standard Danish and Swedish, like other Germanic languages, had one of three grammatical genders: masculine, feminine, or neuter. Over time the feminine and masculine genders merged into a common gender. A common gender is also partly used in some variants of Dutch, but in Dutch the merge is incomplete, with some vestiges in pronouns. Swedish also has deviations from a complete common gender. Danish has no such vestiges since unlike Dutch and German, it does not use the same pronouns for objects and people, but like English, it has natural gender personal pronouns for people and separate grammatical gender pronouns for objects and animals.

Whereas standard Danish and Swedish are very similar in regard to noun genders, many dialects of those languages have separate numbers of grammatical genders from only one to up to three. Norwegian, while similar to those languages, uses three genders in its standard versions, but some dialects, like that of Bergen and the Riksmål dialect of Bokmål, use two.

History and dialects

Around 1300 CE, Danish had three grammatical genders. Masculine nouns formed definite versions with -in (e.g.:  — the day,  — the horse), feminine with -æn ( - the woman,  — the nose), and neuter with either -æt or -it ( - the child,  - the ship). In some dialects, like East Jutlandic, Copenhagen and Stockholm, the -in and -æn suffixes merged to -en forms thereby losing the distinction in definite endings between the two. Nonetheless, pronouns continued to distinguish between the grammatical genders for some time, as han referred to nouns of the masculine gender, and likewise  (Da.) /  (Swedish) was used for nouns of the feminine gender.

Other dialects have kept the gender distinction in the definite suffixes, like Insular Danish in which only the feminine suffix became -en while masculine form lost the n and became -i ( - the day,  - the cat), wnd Norwegian and most Swedish dialects in which the masculine suffix became -en but the feminine suffix lost the n and became -a ( — the mother).

Grammar

Pronouns
Like in English, accusative and dative cases are merged to one objective case and is only marked on object pronouns.

Articles
North Germanic languages use a definite suffix (or enclitic article)  instead of a definite article, except when a preposition is attached to the noun, then a definite article is placed in front. Because these normally attach to common nouns and not proper nouns, they are usually not used for people. The only exceptions are as an epithet or a description, in which case the definite article for the common gender is used.

Neutral natural gender

Due to using natural genders for people, a problem arises when discussing a person of unknown or undefined gender. Traditionally the masculine pronouns have been used in that case, but that has caused some concern about cultural sexism. As a solution some feminists in Sweden have proposed to add a third class of gender-neutral pronouns for people. This is used in some places in Sweden. The Danish translation is added in parentheses, but is not actually used, and lacks objective and possessive versions. In 2015,  was introduced in SAOL, the word list (spelling dictionary) of the Swedish Academy.

See also
 Danish grammar
 Swedish grammar
 Grammatical gender
 English personal pronouns
 Gender in Dutch grammar

References

Danish grammar
Swedish language
Grammatical gender